O'Connor Airlines was an airline based in Mount Gambier, South Australia. It operated scheduled services from Mount Gambier to destinations in South Australia and Victoria. Its main base was Mount Gambier Airport, with a hub at Adelaide Airport, which serviced Mildura Airport and Port Augusta Airport. The airline also serviced Whyalla Airport until September 2007.

History 

The airline was established and started operations in 1973. Beginning as a one-aeroplane flight school in South Australia, O'Connor Airlines developed, over some years, into a freight and passenger service flying to 18 regional and country centres across the state. This was to change when it lost the freight contact. It subsequently relaunched itself, rebasing in Mount Gambier, and began services from that city to Adelaide and Melbourne. The IATA Code OL was used up to 1990. It then started flying to Whyalla. It began to service Mildura in 1998, purchasing a QantasLink route. In 2006, after Airlines of South Australia ceased operations, it began flying from Adelaide to Port Augusta.

The airline used Qantas facilities at both Adelaide and Melbourne airports. Originally, it used those of Australian Airlines.

In November 2007 O'Connor Airline was placed into voluntary administration with debts of between $4–5m AUD. This was largely blamed on high maintenance costs and high competition. Administrators McGrath Nicol was at the time looking for a buyer of the service.

O'Connor Airlines ceased operations on 14 December 2007 after its administrators were unable to find a buyer willing to purchase the airline as a going concern. On 21 February 2008, the airline's creditors voted for a pooled Deed of Company Arrangement (DoCA) for the airline group to be broken up and then commence trading again under new ownership. Many of the assets were subsequently purchased by Mount Gambier businessman Adrian de Bruin, including the Air Operator's Certificate, and used to establish de Bruin Air.

Destinations 
South Australia
Adelaide Airport
Port Augusta Airport
Mount Gambier Airport
Whyalla Airport
Victoria
Mildura Airport
Melbourne Airport
O'Connor flew to Renmark for a brief period in 2001. During 2000 the airline carried 41,732 passengers.

Melbourne services ceased 1 July 2007 and Whyalla services ceased 3 September 2007

Fleet
The O'Connor Airlines fleet consisted of the following aircraft (at March 2007):

2 BAe Jetstream 32

References

External links

O'Connor Airlines
Press Release of Melbourne Cessation

Airlines established in 1973
Airlines disestablished in 2007
Defunct airlines of Australia
1973 establishments in Australia
2007 disestablishments in Australia